Qaleh-ye Aqdarreh (also Romanized as Qal‘eh-ye Āqdarreh; also known as Āqdarreh and Aqdarreh) is a village in Shahsavan Kandi Rural District, in the Central District of Saveh County, Markazi Province, Iran. At the 2006 census, its population was 15, in 12 families.

References 

Populated places in Saveh County